Leonel Ríos (born 17 November 1983 in Buenos Aires) is a retired Argentine football midfielder.

Ríos began his career at Independiente in 2001, in 2004 he moved to Spain to play for UD Almería but returned to Argentina shortly afterward to play for Arsenal de Sarandí. In 2006, he was signed by Italian Serie B side Genoa, who loaned him to Serie A club Reggina Calcio. However, Ríos failed to gain a place in the team and on January 31, 2007, he was signed by Rosario Central.

Ríos signed for Vélez Sársfield for the start of the 2007–08 season. He subsequently returned to Independiente for the Apertura 2008 tournament. In the summer of 2009 he went back to Europe this time for Asteras Tripolis on the Greek Super League.

He signed a six-month contract with Kavala F.C. in 2011. After the 6 months, Kavala did not re-sign the player, making him a free agent.

Ríos returned to Argentina following his contract had expired and on 14 July 2011 joined Olimpo de Bahía Blanca on free transfer.

The highlight of Ríos' career so far was being part of the Independiente squad that won the Apertura tournament in 2002. He has also appeared over 200 times for "El Rojo".

External links
 Argentine Primera statistics at Fútbol XXI 
 
 

1983 births
Living people
Argentine footballers
Argentine people of Spanish descent
Association football midfielders
Argentine Primera División players
Club Atlético Independiente footballers
Arsenal de Sarandí footballers
UD Almería players
Rosario Central footballers
Club Atlético Vélez Sarsfield footballers
Olimpo footballers
Serie A players
Reggina 1914 players
Super League Greece players
Asteras Tripolis F.C. players
Kavala F.C. players
Godoy Cruz Antonio Tomba footballers
Club Atlético Brown footballers
Boyacá Chicó F.C. footballers
Atlético Venezuela C.F. players
Boca Unidos footballers
Club Atlético Fénix players
Argentine expatriate footballers
Expatriate footballers in Spain
Expatriate footballers in Italy
Expatriate footballers in Greece
Expatriate footballers in Venezuela
Argentine expatriate sportspeople in Italy
Argentine expatriate sportspeople in Spain
Argentine expatriate sportspeople in Greece
Argentine expatriate sportspeople in Venezuela
Footballers from Buenos Aires